The Berkeley Free Clinic is a non-profit community clinic located in Berkeley, California, US. It is operated as a worker-run collective by more than 100 volunteers. It has provided free medical care since opening in 1969.

History
The Berkeley Free Clinic was founded in 1969 during the People's Park riots in Berkeley. Two founders were local booksellers Moe Moskowitz and Fred Cody, of Moe's Books and Cody's Books. The Berkeley Free Clinic operates as a non-profit clinic that relies entirely on donations and government funding. It is run by volunteers who receive clinic and classroom training. The Berkeley Free Clinic strives to treat and value its patients with dignity and respect. Since opening, the Berkeley Free Clinic has provided both medical and dental assistance. As the need for the clinic expanded, so did its resources and hours of operation. Today, in addition to its normal hours of operation, the Berkeley Free Clinic has devoted hours to solely treating undocumented immigrants by providing them with free dental procedures for life. In 2009, the clinic faced severe budget cuts due to the fiscal crisis in the state of California.

Services

Acute primary medical care 
Although limited, the primary care clinician team provides services for common respiratory illnesses, hepatitis infections, uncomplicated skin rashes/wounds, simple ear issues, and gynecological concerns. It also provides testing for urinary tract infections, sexually transmitted diseases, pregnancy, and tuberculosis. The clinic offers flu shots and tetanus boosters as well.

Tuberculosis testing
The mission statement of the tuberculosis team is to provide "client-centered care to all people". A tuberculosis bacteria (TB) skin test involves two visits to the clinic.
In the first visit, a tiny amount of a liquid, tuberculin, is injected under the skin in the forearm. In a follow-up appointment two or three days later, the skin test site is examined by the provider. A positive result (a raised, swollen bump at the injection site), indicates the person is infected with tuberculosis bacteria, while a negative result (no/little injection site reaction) means the person is unlike to be infected with TB.

Dental services
The dental care providers emphasize the importance of "good oral health" in overall patient health. The team is composed of licensed dentists, hygienists and dental assistants. The currently offered dental services include oral examinations and most common dental procedures, including cleanings, fillings, and tooth extractions.

In order to be seen in the clinic and receive free dental services for life, client candidates must enter and win a monthly raffle.

HIV + STI testing
As a part of the Gay Men's Health Collective, the Berkeley Free Clinic provides testing for several sexually transmitted diseases, including chlamydia, gonorrhea, syphilis, trichomoniasis, herpes, human immunodeficiency virus (HIV), and others.

A special service within this department is weekly, drop-in, anonymous HIV testing, during which no patient information is retained for records.

Hepatitis testing and counseling 
Testing and counseling for hepatitis A, B and C, as well as vaccinations for hepatitis A and influenza, are available. The focus is on providing care for the population most at risk for hepatitis infection. Non-low-income individuals are asked to complete the vaccination series with their primary care providers so as to reserve availability for low-income individuals.

Women's, trans, and gender non-conforming services
Berkeley Free Clinic supports inclusion of trans people in its care. Sexual health services are provided for all women, trans, gender non-conforming individuals, and any other individual who is not a cis-gender male. These services include sexually transmitted infection testing and treatment, pregnancy tests, urinary tract infection testing, and gynecological/urogenital services (such as pelvic exams).

Clients with symptoms of sexually transmitted infection or urogenital infection are encouraged to call in advance to ensure appointment availability.

Peer counseling
The Peer Counseling Collective strives to provide a space for clients to talk about anything. Volunteers are not able to diagnose, write prescriptions, or offer advice. Some notable counselors include Berkeley homelessness activist Michael Diehl, who recently passed away.

Eyeglasses and vision screening
Berkeley Free Clinic partners with Mindful Eyes Foundation to provide optometry services, including over-the-counter reading eyeglasses (no prescription needed), prescription eyeglasses (prescription needed), and various screening tests. No prescriptions are written or made available.

Clients are eligible if they are armed forces veterans, low-income adults (age 18 or older), or adults receiving Medi-Cal or county health benefits.

Expansions

Offering services to undocumented immigrants 
Berkeley Free Clinic offers services regardless of immigration status and requires no documentation or payment.

In February 2017, the Berkeley Free Clinic created a program that offers free dental work to undocumented immigrants. This service is provided on one to three Friday evenings per month, which is outside of normal clinic business hours, and is time specifically allotted for this kind of patient. In order to be a part of the program, patients must not qualify for Medi-Cal or have refugee status. Most of these clients learn about the programs from outside organizations like East Bay Sanctuary Covenant and Oakland Catholic Worker.

Obtaining a larger facility 
Berkeley Free Clinic intends to move into a new building and hopes to upgrade and expand its accommodations in the process. The desired facility improvements include: a new lobby with restrooms, at least six equipped exam rooms, a dental suite with adequate space that contains three new dental stations and an X-ray machine, six counseling rooms (five individual and one larger group), a clinic for optical services with two exam rooms, larger meeting spaces and storage areas, and a new lab and pharmacy. The clinic hopes to find a suitable space in downtown Berkeley and is seeking public support to make it happen.

See also
Haight Ashbury Free Clinics

References

External links
 Berkeley Free Clinic homepage
Daily Californian video feed on the Free Clinic fiscal crisis, at Youtube

Clinics in California
Organizations based in Berkeley, California
Non-profit organizations based in California
Healthcare in the San Francisco Bay Area
Worker cooperatives of the United States
Medical and health organizations based in California